Ahl Fas Mosque is a mosque in the capital city of Rabat, Morocco. It is located at the mechouar of Al-Sayeed. The mosque was commissioned by the Alaouite sultan Mohammed ben Abdallah in the 18th century. It was renovated several times, during the era of Muhammad IV, Yusef, Muhammad V, Hassan II, and Muhammad VI. The mosque is known as a place where the king gives the khotbah (sermon) during the Friday Prayer or Eid Prayers, a tradition dating back to the era of Moulay Yusef.

See also
 List of mosques in Morocco

References

18th-century mosques
Mosques in Rabat
Religious buildings and structures in Rabat